Attignat is a commune in the Ain department in eastern France.

Administration
Since 2014, Walter Martin has been the mayor of Attignat. He was re-elected in the 2020 municipal elections.

Geography
The commune is 12 km northwest of Bourg-en-Bresse, 4 km north of the A40. The Reyssouze runs through the commune.

Population

See also
Communes of the Ain department

References

External links

Gazetteer Entry

Communes of Ain
Ain communes articles needing translation from French Wikipedia
Bresse